Atner Petrovich Khuzangai (born 8 October 1948) is a Chuvash Russian philologist, literary critic, publicist, leader of the Chuvash national movement, first President, now honorary President of the Chuvash National Congress. Member of the Chuvash Writers' Union (1987).

Biography 
Atner Khuzangai was born in the family of poet  (1907–1970) and actress Vera Kuzmina (1923–2021).

He graduated from the Oriental faculty of Leningrad State University (specialization is Arabic philology and postgraduate studies) and postgraduate study from the Institute of Oriental studies of the Academy of Sciences of the Soviet Union. He trained as a military interpreter in Egypt from 1970 to 1971. In 1977, he was declared a Candidate of Philological Sciences.

Head of the Department of linguistics of the Chuvash State Institute of Humanities.

In the late 1980s and early 1990s, Khuzangai was an active figure of the Chuvash national cultural movement. He was a deputy of the Supreme Council of the Chuvash Republic and chairman of the standing committee on culture. He was a two-time candidate for President of the Chuvash Republic in 1991 and 1993. Between 1992 and 1997, he was president of the Chuvash National Congress, established on his initiative. From 1997 to 2002, he was also the first Vice-President of the General Assembly of the Unrepresented Nations and Peoples Organization.

Proceedings 

 Atner Khoosanguy, Поиск слова. Литературно-критические статьи. — Чебоксары: Чувашгосиздат., 1987. 191 с.
 Atner Khoosanguy, Поэт Айги и художники (Опыт философской интерпретации поэтического и художественного сознания. — Чебоксары, 1998.
 Atner Khoosanguy, Текст, метатексты и путешествия. — Чебоксары: Руссика, 2003. 387 с.
 Atner Khoosanguy, Без иллюзий: мой временник. — Чебоксары: Чуваш. кн. изд-во, 2017. 255 с.

Notes

References

External links 
 Биографическая справка
 Интервью Атнера Хузангая интернет-газете «Свободное слово»
 Атнер Хузангай: "Чувашский народ должен стать нормальным субъектом международного права"
 «Spirit and ideas always win in the end»
 Атнер Хузангай: «Это сладкое слово Свобода…»
 ИХ БРАК БЛАГОСЛОВИЛ ХАМБО ЛАМА

Chuvash people
Chuvash writers
Politics of Chuvashia
Anti-Russification activists
Language activists
Russian political activists
Russian philologists
Soviet philologists
20th-century philologists
Soviet translators
Saint Petersburg State University alumni
People from Cheboksary
1948 births
Living people